Pierre Joassin (6 August 1948 – 4 January 2023) was a Belgian film director and screenwriter.

Filmography

Cinema
 (1976)
 (1987)

Television
 (1995)
Maigret (1995–2004)
 (1999)
Josephine, Guardian Angel (1999)
 (2001–2008)
 (2003)
 (2009)

Telefilms
 (1981)
 (1996)
 (1996)
 (2004)
 (2008)
 (2010)
 (2011)

References

1948 births
2023 deaths
Belgian film directors
Belgian screenwriters
20th-century Belgian people
People from Amay